Nayakan is a 1987 Indian Tamil language film starring Kamal Haasan.

Nayakan may also refer to:

 Nayakan (1985 film), a Malayalam film starring Mohanlal
 Nayagan (2008 film), a Tamil film starring J. K. Rithesh
 Nayakan (2010 film), a Malayalam film starring Indrajith Sukumaran